This is a list of political parties in the U.S. state of Oregon.

Statewide parties
The following is a list of political parties officially recognized by the Oregon State Elections Division as statewide parties as of March 2023 (alphabetical, by title in official record).

 Constitution Party (see also Constitution Party (United States))
 Democratic Party (see also Democratic Party (United States))
 Independent Party of Oregon
 Libertarian Party (see also Libertarian Party (United States))
 No Labels
 Pacific Green Party (see also Green Party (United States))
 Progressive Party (Known as the "Oregon Peace Party" until September 18, 2009)
 Republican Party (see also Republican Party (United States))
 Working Families Party (see also Working Families Party)

Major and minor party growth 

Major Party Growth Comparison

Minor Party Growth Comparison

Less than statewide parties
The following are recognized as parties, but not certified to nominate for statewide office.

Socialist Party (Congressional District 3, has not fielded a candidate since 2004)

Local and non-recognized parties
 Oregon Patriot Party
 Freedom Socialist Party
 Socialist Alternative

See also
 Politics of Oregon
 Oregon statewide elections, 2006
 Lists of political parties
 Lists of Oregon-related topics

References

 
Political parties
Oregon